A volley gun is a gun with multiple single-shot barrels that shoot projectiles in volley fire, either simultaneously or in succession.  Although capable of unleashing intense firepower, volley guns differ from modern machine guns in that they lack autoloading and automatic fire mechanisms, and therefore their volume of fire is limited by the number of barrels bundled together.

In practice, large volley guns were not particularly more useful than a cannon firing canister shot or grapeshot. Since they were still mounted on a carriage, they could be as hard to aim and move around as a cannon, and the many barrels took as long or longer to reload. They also tended to be relatively expensive since they were more complex than a cannon, due to all the barrels and ignition fuses, and each barrel had to be individually maintained and cleaned.

15th-century volley guns 

The Ribauldequin was a medieval version of the volley gun. It had its barrels set up in parallel.  This early version was first employed during the Hundred Years' War by the army of Edward III of England, in 1339. Later on, the late Swiss army employed it.

In the mid-1570s a volley gun referred to as an ‘ingen of war’ was presented to the government of England which was capable of holding from 160 to 320 shots and discharging them 4, 8, 12 or 24 bullets at a time. Multi-barreled artillery pieces continued in use during the 16th and 17th century. A double-barreled cannon called Elizabeth-Henry, named after Charles I's youngest children, was used by the Cavaliers during the English Civil War and fired 2oz charges. It could also fire grapeshot. The barrels were wrapped in leather to prevent rusting.

On the continent, 16th century Aragon developed a 15-barrel volley gun; German and Polish gunsmiths invented handheld multi-barrel guns. These were sometimes combination sword and axe pistols such as Henry VIII's Walking Staff, a 3-barreled gun and battle mace. Henry VIII also owned a multi-barreled German wheel lock rifle capable of firing a superimposed charge.

18th-century volley guns 

The Nock gun resembled a conventional flintlock musket with seven barrels hexagonally brazed around a central barrel.  All seven .46 caliber (12 mm) barrels were connected to the single flintlock pan in a manner intended to produce simultaneous discharge through row ignition, but one or more barrels frequently failed to fire.  The gun was invented by James Wilson in 1779 and manufactured by Henry Nock for use through the Napoleonic Wars.  Five hundred Nock guns were produced for the Royal Navy intended for use in repelling boarders or to clear an enemy deck in advance of friendly boarding parties. Admiral Howe's fleet was issued twenty guns for each ship of the line and twelve guns for each frigate.  Recoil of the 13-pound (5.9 kg) Nock gun caused dislocated shoulders and clavicle fractures among the sailors firing Nock guns; and the muzzle flash from simultaneous discharge of multiple barrels could ignite canvas sail when fired from positions in the rigging.  The Nock volley gun was considered obsolete by 1805, but a surviving weapon was carried by Richard Widmark in the 1960 movie The Alamo. The Nock gun was recently brought to public attention by its inclusion in Bernard Cornwell's Sharpe novels where it was wielded by both Sharpe and his friend and colleague Sergeant Patrick Harper.

A breech-loading volley gun that was reloaded using multiple breech pieces, similar to the later mitrailleuse, was developed in France in 1775 by a Du Perron.

19th-century volley guns 

Two notable artillery-sized volley guns were developed in the mid-19th century, although neither was particularly successful in practice. Developed in the 1860s and based on an 1850s design by a captain Fafschamps, the French  is an example of a multi-barreled volley gun that could fire all of its barrels simultaneously or sequentially over a short period of time. Also developed in the 1860s, General Origen Vandenburgh of the New York State Militia designed a weapon that had eighty-five parallel .50 caliber rifle barrels. After failing to sell the weapon to the United Kingdom, he reportedly sold a small number to the Confederate States of America, although there is no record that they were actually used. One Vandenburgh gun was located at Fort Fisher, North Carolina, and another reportedly at Salisbury, NC.

A few hand-held volley guns were also developed during the 18th and 19th centuries. One of the most distinctive was the "duck's foot" volley gun, a pistol with multiple barrels arranged in a splayed pattern, so that the firer could spray a sizable area with a single shot. The principle behind this type of pistol is one of confrontation by one person against a group; hence, it was popular among bank guards, prison wardens and sea captains in the early 19th century.

In July 1835,  used a home-made, 25-barrel volley gun to attempt the assassination of King Louis Philippe I in Paris. He fired the weapon from a third-floor window while the king and his entourage were passing in the street below. Although 18 people were killed, the king only received a minor wound. The gun barrels had been sold as scrap by a government arsenal after being labeled as defective and four of them burst when fired.  was badly injured and was quickly captured. He and two others involved in the plot were condemned to death and guillotined in 1836.

Modern connection 

A number of designs of electronically fired explosive-propulsion projectile weapons and non-explosive projectile weapons were developed by Metal Storm Limited which had some similarities to 18th-century volley guns, particularly in that they use many barrels which can be fired all at once or in sequence such as the Nordenfelt gun. These designs met with little commercial interest and Metal Storm Limited entered administration in 2012.

The Spanish Navy uses a volley gun system, the Meroka, which consists of twelve Oerlikon 20 mm cannons mounted in a tight cluster with an externally powered automatic loading system. It delivers an exceptionally high rate of fire for a very short burst, and reloads in less than 0.3 seconds. This makes it suitable for close-range defense against missiles, aircraft and small boats.

In 2019, Standard Manufacturing introduced the S333 Thunderstruck, a double-barreled revolver which fires two rounds with each pull of the trigger.

See also 
 Billinghurst Requa Battery
 Double-barreled cannon
 Multiple-barrel firearm
 Multiple rocket launcher
 Nock gun
 Organ gun
 Pepperbox
 Ripley machine gun
 Wall gun

References

External links 
 

1339
Early machine guns
Firearm actions
Infantry support weapons
Salvo weapons